The Nokia 6030, introduced in Q1 2005, is a GSM dual band handset operating on frequencies 900 and 1800 MHz (850 and 1900 MHz in the North American model), with automatic switching between frequencies. It is small in size with dimensions of 104 x 44 x 18 mm and weighs 90 grams. It also has 3MB Shared Memory.

Its key features are:
 High-resolution color display with up to 65,536 colors (128 x 128 pixels)
 Multimedia messaging (MMS)
 GPRS and WAP 2.0 services
 Nokia Series 40 Theme compatibility
 FM radio (with supported Nokia headset)
 MIDI audio playback (up to 16 channels)
 Address book, calendar, and reminders
 Java ME compatibility
 Xpress-on covers

The 6030 supports GPRS up to 40 kbit/s speed and Wireless Application Protocol (WAP) 2.0 services. An XHTML browser is integrated, allowing for WAP web capability. The phone book can hold up to 300 entries and its calendar can hold up to 500 entries.  It has been proven to be a very durable phone, with users reporting dropping it several times, throwing it across a room, dropping it into water, etc. with the phone still running afterward.

On the bottom panel of the Nokia 6030 is a 4-pin connector similar to a USB port, a bit smaller than normal 4-pin mini-USB connectors, but it is an FBus port, named the EZ Flash port, and the data cable for this port is not supplied for end-users. There is no official data cable connection for 6030 end-user.

External links

Page on the Nokia 6030 at Nokia Developer website
Nokia's U.S. page on the Nokia 6030

References

 http://www.ebay.com/ctg/Nokia-6030-Black-ATT-Cellular-Phone-/99987275?_refkw=nokia+6030

6030
Mobile phones introduced in 2005